Manuel Zuliani (born 26 April 2000) is an Italian professional rugby union player who primarily plays flanker for Benetton of the United Rugby Championship.

Professional career 
Selected for F.I.R. Academy, he represented Calvisano in the 2019–20 European Rugby Challenge Cup as Additional Player. Under contract with Mogliano, for the last part of 2019–20 Pro14 season and for the 2020–21 Pro14 season, he was named as Permit Player for Benetton.   

In January 2019, Zuliani was also named in the Italy Under 20 squad for the 2019 Six Nations Under 20s Championship and in 2020 the squad for the 2020 Six Nations Under 20s Championship.

On the 13 January 2022, he was selected by Kieran Crowley to be part of an Italy 33-man squad for the 2022 Six Nations Championship. He made his debut against France.

References

External links 

Manuel Zuliani at All.rugby
Manuel Zuliani at Elite Athlete Management

2000 births
Living people
Italian rugby union players
Rugby Calvisano players
Benetton Rugby players
Rugby union flankers
Mogliano Rugby players
Italy international rugby union players
People from Castelfranco Veneto